This is a list of species in the foliose lichen genus Xanthoparmelia. It is the most speciose lichen genus, containing an estimated 822 species as of 2020. The key characteristics of Xanthoparmelia include the cell walls containing Xanthoparmelia-type lichenan, the pored epicortex, margins without cilia, simple rhizines, small, ellipsoidal spores and bifusiform or rarely weakly fusiform or bacilliform conidia.

A
Xanthoparmelia abraxas   – South Africa
Xanthoparmelia acrita   – Africa
Xanthoparmelia adamantea 
Xanthoparmelia adhaerens 
Xanthoparmelia adlerae  – South America
Xanthoparmelia adpicta 
Xanthoparmelia adusta 
Xanthoparmelia affinis 
Xanthoparmelia africana  – Africa
Xanthoparmelia afroincerta 
Xanthoparmelia afrolavicola 
Xanthoparmelia agamalis 
Xanthoparmelia aggregata  – Africa
Xanthoparmelia ahtii 
Xanthoparmelia ajoensis 
Xanthoparmelia albomaculata 
Xanthoparmelia alectoronica 
Xanthoparmelia alexandrensis 
Xanthoparmelia aliphatica  – Africa
Xanthoparmelia aliphaticella 
Xanthoparmelia alligatensis  – Australia
Xanthoparmelia almbornii 
Xanthoparmelia alternata 
Xanthoparmelia amableana 
Xanthoparmelia amphixantha 
Xanthoparmelia amphixanthoides 
Xanthoparmelia amplexula 
Xanthoparmelia amplexuloides 
Xanthoparmelia angustiphylla 
Xanthoparmelia annexa 
Xanthoparmelia antleriformis 
Xanthoparmelia applicata 
Xanthoparmelia applicatella 
Xanthoparmelia aranaea 
Xanthoparmelia arapilensis 
Xanthoparmelia arcana 
Xanthoparmelia archeri 
Xanthoparmelia areolata  – Africa
Xanthoparmelia arida 
Xanthoparmelia aridella 
Xanthoparmelia arrecta 
Xanthoparmelia arvidssonii 
Xanthoparmelia asilaris 
Xanthoparmelia assimilis  – South Africa
Xanthoparmelia astricta 
Xanthoparmelia atrobarbatica 
Xanthoparmelia atrocapnodes 
Xanthoparmelia atroventralis 
Xanthoparmelia atroviridis 
Xanthoparmelia attica 
Xanthoparmelia atticoides 
Xanthoparmelia auricampa  – Australia
Xanthoparmelia aurifera 
Xanthoparmelia ausiana 
Xanthoparmelia australasica 
Xanthoparmelia australiensis 
Xanthoparmelia austroafricana 
Xanthoparmelia austroalpina 
Xanthoparmelia austroamericana 
Xanthoparmelia austrocapensis 
Xanthoparmelia austroconstrictans  – Australia
Xanthoparmelia azaniensis

B
Xanthoparmelia baeomycesica  – Australia
Xanthoparmelia bainskloofensis  – Africa
Xanthoparmelia ballingalliana  – Australia
Xanthoparmelia barbatica 
Xanthoparmelia barbellata 
Xanthoparmelia barda 
Xanthoparmelia barklyensis  – Africa
Xanthoparmelia barthlottii 
Xanthoparmelia bartlettii 
Xanthoparmelia basutoensis 
Xanthoparmelia beatricea  – Africa
Xanthoparmelia beccae 
Xanthoparmelia beckeri 
Xanthoparmelia bellatula 
Xanthoparmelia benyovszkyana 
Xanthoparmelia bibax 
Xanthoparmelia bicolorans  – Australia
Xanthoparmelia bicontinens 
Xanthoparmelia bihemispherica 
Xanthoparmelia biloelensis 
Xanthoparmelia blackdownensis  – Australia
Xanthoparmelia boonahensis 
Xanthoparmelia botryoides 
Xanthoparmelia bourgeanica 
Xanthoparmelia boyaginensis 
Xanthoparmelia boyeri  – Africa
Xanthoparmelia brachinaensis 
Xanthoparmelia brandwagensis 
Xanthoparmelia brattii 
Xanthoparmelia brasiliensis 
Xanthoparmelia brevilobata  – Africa
Xanthoparmelia brownlieae 
Xanthoparmelia brunella 
Xanthoparmelia brunnthaleri 
Xanthoparmelia brussei 
Xanthoparmelia buedelii 
Xanthoparmelia bulfiniana 
Xanthoparmelia bullabullensis 
Xanthoparmelia bungendorensis 
Xanthoparmelia burmeisteri

C

Xanthoparmelia cafferensis 
Xanthoparmelia calida  – Australia
Xanthoparmelia californica 
Xanthoparmelia caliginosa 
Xanthoparmelia callifolioides 
Xanthoparmelia calvinia  – Africa
Xanthoparmelia camtschadalis 
Xanthoparmelia canobolasensis  – Australia
Xanthoparmelia caparidensis 
Xanthoparmelia capensis  – Africa
Xanthoparmelia capnoexillima  – Australia
Xanthoparmelia catarinae 
Xanthoparmelia cedri-montana  – Africa
Xanthoparmelia centralis 
Xanthoparmelia ceresella 
Xanthoparmelia ceresensis  – Africa
Xanthoparmelia ceresina 
Xanthoparmelia cerussata 
Xanthoparmelia chalybaeizans 
Xanthoparmelia cheelii 
Xanthoparmelia chionophila 
Xanthoparmelia chiricahuensis 
Xanthoparmelia chlorochroa 
Xanthoparmelia chudalupensis 
Xanthoparmelia cirrhomedullosa 
Xanthoparmelia claviculata 
Xanthoparmelia clivorum 
Xanthoparmelia colensoica 
Xanthoparmelia colensoides 
Xanthoparmelia coloradoensis 
Xanthoparmelia colorata 
Xanthoparmelia columbariensis 
Xanthoparmelia commonii 
Xanthoparmelia competita  – Africa
Xanthoparmelia concolor 
Xanthoparmelia concomitans 
Xanthoparmelia condaminensis  – Australia
Xanthoparmelia condyloides 
Xanthoparmelia coneruptens 
Xanthoparmelia congensis 
Xanthoparmelia congesta 
Xanthoparmelia conglomerata 
Xanthoparmelia conjuncta 
Xanthoparmelia conranensis 
Xanthoparmelia consociata 
Xanthoparmelia conspersa 
Xanthoparmelia conspersula 
Xanthoparmelia constipata 
Xanthoparmelia contrasta  – Africa
Xanthoparmelia conturbata 
Xanthoparmelia convexa 
Xanthoparmelia convexula 
Xanthoparmelia convoluta 
Xanthoparmelia convolutella 
Xanthoparmelia convolutoides  – Australia
Xanthoparmelia cordillerana 
Xanthoparmelia coreana 
Xanthoparmelia coriacea  – Africa
Xanthoparmelia cotopaxiensis 
Xanthoparmelia cranfieldii  – Australia
Xanthoparmelia crassilobata  – Africa
Xanthoparmelia cravenii 
Xanthoparmelia crawfordensis 
Xanthoparmelia crespoae 
Xanthoparmelia crustulosa 
Xanthoparmelia crystallicola 
Xanthoparmelia cumberlandia 
Xanthoparmelia curnowiae  – Australia
Xanthoparmelia cylindriloba  – Africa

D
Xanthoparmelia dapperensis 
Xanthoparmelia darlingensis  – Australia
Xanthoparmelia dayiana 
Xanthoparmelia delisei 
Xanthoparmelia delisiella 
Xanthoparmelia denudata 
Xanthoparmelia depsidella 
Xanthoparmelia desertorum 
Xanthoparmelia diacida  – Africa
Xanthoparmelia diadeta 
Xanthoparmelia dichotoma 
Xanthoparmelia dichromatica 
Xanthoparmelia dierythra 
Xanthoparmelia diffractaica  – Africa
Xanthoparmelia digitiformis 
Xanthoparmelia dissensa 
Xanthoparmelia dissitifolia 
Xanthoparmelia diutina 
Xanthoparmelia domboensis 
Xanthoparmelia domokosii 
Xanthoparmelia domokosioides 
Xanthoparmelia donneri 
Xanthoparmelia dregeana 
Xanthoparmelia dubitata 
Xanthoparmelia dubitella  – Africa
Xanthoparmelia duplicata  – Africa
Xanthoparmelia durietzii 
Xanthoparmelia dwaasbergensis 
Xanthoparmelia dysprosa  – Africa

E
Xanthoparmelia echidnaformis  – Australia
Xanthoparmelia echinocarpica 
Xanthoparmelia effigurata  – Africa
Xanthoparmelia eganii 
Xanthoparmelia eilifii 
Xanthoparmelia elaeodes 
Xanthoparmelia eldridgei 
Xanthoparmelia elevata  – Australia
Xanthoparmelia elixii 
Xanthoparmelia emolumenta 
Xanthoparmelia endochromatica  – Africa
Xanthoparmelia endochrysea 
Xanthoparmelia endomiltodes 
Xanthoparmelia enteroxantha  – Africa
Xanthoparmelia epacridea 
Xanthoparmelia epheboides 
Xanthoparmelia epigaea  – Africa
Xanthoparmelia equalis  – Africa
Xanthoparmelia erebea 
Xanthoparmelia erosa 
Xanthoparmelia eruptens  – Africa
Xanthoparmelia erythrocardia 
Xanthoparmelia esslingeri 
Xanthoparmelia esterhuyseniae  – Africa
Xanthoparmelia everardensis 
Xanthoparmelia evernica  – Africa
Xanthoparmelia ewersii  – Australia
Xanthoparmelia examplaris 
Xanthoparmelia exillima 
Xanthoparmelia exuviata

F
Xanthoparmelia fangii   – Australia
Xanthoparmelia farinosa 
Xanthoparmelia fausta 
Xanthoparmelia felkaensis 
Xanthoparmelia ferraroiana 
Xanthoparmelia ferruma 
Xanthoparmelia festiva 
Xanthoparmelia filarszkyana 
Xanthoparmelia filsonii 
Xanthoparmelia fissurina 
Xanthoparmelia flavescentireagens 
Xanthoparmelia flindersiana 
Xanthoparmelia follmannii 
Xanthoparmelia formosana 
Xanthoparmelia foveolata 
Xanthoparmelia fracticollis 
Xanthoparmelia franklinensis 
Xanthoparmelia freycinetiana  – Australia
Xanthoparmelia fucina  – Africa
Xanthoparmelia fumarafricana 
Xanthoparmelia fumarprotocetrarica 
Xanthoparmelia fumigata  – Australia
Xanthoparmelia furcata 
Xanthoparmelia fynbosiana

G
Xanthoparmelia ganymedea 
Xanthoparmelia geesterani 
Xanthoparmelia gemmulifera 
Xanthoparmelia gerhardii 
Xanthoparmelia glabrans 
Xanthoparmelia glareosa 
Xanthoparmelia globisidiosa  – Africa
Xanthoparmelia globulifera 
Xanthoparmelia glomelliferonica 
Xanthoparmelia glomerulata 
Xanthoparmelia gongylodes 
Xanthoparmelia graniticola 
Xanthoparmelia granulata 
Xanthoparmelia gregaria 
Xanthoparmelia greytonensis 
Xanthoparmelia gyrophorica  – Africa

H
Xanthoparmelia hafellneri  – Australia
Xanthoparmelia halei 
Xanthoparmelia harrisii 
Xanthoparmelia heinarii 
Xanthoparmelia hensseniae 
Xanthoparmelia heterodoxa 
Xanthoparmelia hirosakiensis 
Xanthoparmelia hondensis 
Xanthoparmelia hottentotta 
Xanthoparmelia huachucensis 
Xanthoparmelia hueana 
Xanthoparmelia huttonii 
Xanthoparmelia hybrida  – Africa
Xanthoparmelia hybridella 
Xanthoparmelia hybridiza  – Australia
Xanthoparmelia hypoconstictica 
Xanthoparmelia hypoleiella 
Xanthoparmelia hypomelaena 
Xanthoparmelia hypomelaenoides 
Xanthoparmelia hypoprotocetrarica 
Xanthoparmelia hypopsila 
Xanthoparmelia hyporhytida 
Xanthoparmelia hyposalazinica  – Australia
Xanthoparmelia hypostictica 
Xanthoparmelia hypothamnolica

I

Xanthoparmelia ianthina 
Xanthoparmelia idahoensis 
Xanthoparmelia imbricata 
Xanthoparmelia imitatricoides 
Xanthoparmelia imitatrix 
Xanthoparmelia immutata 
Xanthoparmelia incantata 
Xanthoparmelia incerta 
Xanthoparmelia incomposita 
Xanthoparmelia inconspicua  – Africa
Xanthoparmelia inconspicuella 
Xanthoparmelia incrustata 
Xanthoparmelia indumenica  – Africa
Xanthoparmelia infausta 
Xanthoparmelia inflata 
Xanthoparmelia infrapallida 
Xanthoparmelia iniquita 
Xanthoparmelia inopinata  – Australia
Xanthoparmelia inops 
Xanthoparmelia inselbergia 
Xanthoparmelia inuncta 
Xanthoparmelia ischnoides 
Xanthoparmelia isidiascens 
Xanthoparmelia isidiigera 
Xanthoparmelia isidiosa 
Xanthoparmelia isidiotegeta 
Xanthoparmelia isidiovagans  – Spain

J
Xanthoparmelia jarmaniae 
Xanthoparmelia joranadia 
Xanthoparmelia juxtata

K
Xanthoparmelia kalbarriensis  – Australia
Xanthoparmelia kalbii 
Xanthoparmelia karolinensis  – Australia
Xanthoparmelia karoo  – Africa
Xanthoparmelia karooensis  – Africa
Xanthoparmelia kasachstania 
Xanthoparmelia kashiwadanii 
Xanthoparmelia kenyana 
Xanthoparmelia keralensis 
Xanthoparmelia khomasiana 
Xanthoparmelia kiboensis 
Xanthoparmelia kimberleyensis  – Australia
Xanthoparmelia klauskalbii 
Xanthoparmelia kleinswartbergensis  – Africa
Xanthoparmelia knoxii 
Xanthoparmelia knudsenii 
Xanthoparmelia kondininensis 
Xanthoparmelia kosciuszkoensis 
Xanthoparmelia kotisephola 
Xanthoparmelia krogiae

L

Xanthoparmelia laciniata  – Africa
Xanthoparmelia lagunebergensis  – Africa
Xanthoparmelia lapidula 
Xanthoparmelia latilobata  – Africa
Xanthoparmelia lavicola 
Xanthoparmelia laxchalybaeizans  – Africa
Xanthoparmelia laxencrustans 
Xanthoparmelia lecanoracea  – Africa
Xanthoparmelia lecanorica 
Xanthoparmelia leppii 
Xanthoparmelia lesothoensis  – Africa
Xanthoparmelia leucophaea 
Xanthoparmelia leucostigma  – Africa
Xanthoparmelia lichinoidea 
Xanthoparmelia lineella 
Xanthoparmelia lineola 
Xanthoparmelia lipochlorochroa 
Xanthoparmelia lithophila 
Xanthoparmelia lithophiloides 
Xanthoparmelia lividica  – Africa
Xanthoparmelia lobarica 
Xanthoparmelia lobulatella 
Xanthoparmelia lobulifera  – Africa
Xanthoparmelia lobuliferella  – Africa
Xanthoparmelia lopezii 
Xanthoparmelia loriloba 
Xanthoparmelia louisii 
Xanthoparmelia loxodella 
Xanthoparmelia loxodes 
Xanthoparmelia lucrosa 
Xanthoparmelia luderitziana 
Xanthoparmelia lumbschii 
Xanthoparmelia luminosa 
Xanthoparmelia luteonotata 
Xanthoparmelia lynii 
Xanthoparmelia lyrigera

M

Xanthoparmelia maccarthyi 
Xanthoparmelia maculodecipiens 
Xanthoparmelia madeirensis 
Xanthoparmelia magnificans 
Xanthoparmelia mahuiana 
Xanthoparmelia malawiensis  – Africa
Xanthoparmelia malcolmii 
Xanthoparmelia manina 
Xanthoparmelia mannumensis 
Xanthoparmelia mapholanengensis 
Xanthoparmelia marcellii 
Xanthoparmelia maricopensis 
Xanthoparmelia maritima 
Xanthoparmelia marroninipuncta 
Xanthoparmelia martinii 
Xanthoparmelia masonii  – Australia
Xanthoparmelia maxima 
Xanthoparmelia mayrhoferi 
Xanthoparmelia mbabanensis 
Xanthoparmelia mehalei 
Xanthoparmelia melancholica 
Xanthoparmelia melanobarbatica 
Xanthoparmelia meruensis 
Xanthoparmelia mesmerizans 
Xanthoparmelia metaclystoides 
Xanthoparmelia metamorphosa 
Xanthoparmelia metastrigosa 
Xanthoparmelia mexicana 
Xanthoparmelia microcephala  – Australia
Xanthoparmelia microlobulata 
Xanthoparmelia micromaculata  – Africa
Xanthoparmelia microphyllizans 
Xanthoparmelia micropsoromica 
Xanthoparmelia microspora 
Xanthoparmelia millerae  – Australia
Xanthoparmelia minuta  – Africa
Xanthoparmelia minutella 
Xanthoparmelia mobergii 
Xanthoparmelia moctezumensis 
Xanthoparmelia mollis  – Africa
Xanthoparmelia molliuscula 
Xanthoparmelia monadnockensis  – Australia
Xanthoparmelia monastica 
Xanthoparmelia mongaensis 
Xanthoparmelia mongolica 
Xanthoparmelia montanensis 
Xanthoparmelia monticola 
Xanthoparmelia morrisii  – Australia
Xanthoparmelia mougeotii 
Xanthoparmelia mougeotina 
Xanthoparmelia multiacida 
Xanthoparmelia multipartita 
Xanthoparmelia murina 
Xanthoparmelia musculina 
Xanthoparmelia mutabilis

N
Xanthoparmelia nakuruensis 
Xanthoparmelia namaensis 
Xanthoparmelia namakwa  – Africa
Xanthoparmelia namaquensis  – Africa
Xanthoparmelia namibiensis 
Xanthoparmelia nana  – Australia
Xanthoparmelia nanoides  – Australia
Xanthoparmelia nashii 
Xanthoparmelia natalensis  – Africa
Xanthoparmelia naudesnekia 
Xanthoparmelia nautilomontana 
Xanthoparmelia nebulosa 
Xanthoparmelia neochlorochroa 
Xanthoparmelia neocongensis 
Xanthoparmelia neocongruens 
Xanthoparmelia neoconspersa 
Xanthoparmelia neocumberlandia 
Xanthoparmelia neodelisei 
Xanthoparmelia neoglabrans 
Xanthoparmelia neokalbii 
Xanthoparmelia neomongaensis 
Xanthoparmelia neononreagens 
Xanthoparmelia neopropagulifera 
Xanthoparmelia neopropaguloides 
Xanthoparmelia neoquintaria 
Xanthoparmelia neoreptans  – Africa
Xanthoparmelia neorimalis 
Xanthoparmelia neosynestia  – Africa
Xanthoparmelia neotaractica 
Xanthoparmelia neotasmanica  – Africa
Xanthoparmelia neotinctina 
Xanthoparmelia neotucsonensis  – Australia
Xanthoparmelia neotumidosa 
Xanthoparmelia neoweberi  – Africa
Xanthoparmelia neowyomingica 
Xanthoparmelia nepalensis 
Xanthoparmelia nerrigensis 
Xanthoparmelia nigraoleosa 
Xanthoparmelia nigrocephala 
Xanthoparmelia nigrolavicola 
Xanthoparmelia nigropsoromifera 
Xanthoparmelia nigroweberi 
Xanthoparmelia nimbicola 
Xanthoparmelia nodulosa  – Australia
Xanthoparmelia nomosa  – Australia
Xanthoparmelia nonreagens  – Australia
Xanthoparmelia norcapnodes 
Xanthoparmelia norchlorochroa 
Xanthoparmelia norcolorata 
Xanthoparmelia norconvoluta 
Xanthoparmelia norhypopsila 
Xanthoparmelia norincomposita 
Xanthoparmelia norlobaridonica 
Xanthoparmelia norlobaronica 
Xanthoparmelia norpraegnans 
Xanthoparmelia norpumila 
Xanthoparmelia norstrigosa 
Xanthoparmelia nortegeta  – Australia
Xanthoparmelia norwalteri 
Xanthoparmelia notata 
Xanthoparmelia notatica 
Xanthoparmelia novomexicana 
Xanthoparmelia numinbahensis 
Xanthoparmelia nuwarensis  – Africa

O
Xanthoparmelia oblisata 
Xanthoparmelia obscurata 
Xanthoparmelia occidentalis 
Xanthoparmelia ochropulchra  – Africa
Xanthoparmelia oleosa 
Xanthoparmelia olifantensis  – Africa
Xanthoparmelia olivetorica  – Africa
Xanthoparmelia olivetoricella 
Xanthoparmelia orchardii 
Xanthoparmelia oreophila 
Xanthoparmelia oribensis  – Africa
Xanthoparmelia orientalis 
Xanthoparmelia osorioi 
Xanthoparmelia ovealmbornii 
Xanthoparmelia oveana

P

Xanthoparmelia pachyclada  – Africa
Xanthoparmelia pantherina  – Australia
Xanthoparmelia paradoxa  – Africa
Xanthoparmelia paraparmeliformis 
Xanthoparmelia parasitica 
Xanthoparmelia paratasmanica 
Xanthoparmelia parviloba 
Xanthoparmelia parvoclystoides 
Xanthoparmelia parvoincerta 
Xanthoparmelia patagonica 
Xanthoparmelia patula 
Xanthoparmelia peloloba 
Xanthoparmelia perezdepazii  – Canary Islands
Xanthoparmelia perfissa 
Xanthoparmelia perplexa 
Xanthoparmelia perrugata 
Xanthoparmelia perrugosa  – Africa
Xanthoparmelia pertinax 
Xanthoparmelia petriseda 
Xanthoparmelia phillipsiana 
Xanthoparmelia pictada 
Xanthoparmelia piedmontensis 
Xanthoparmelia pimbaensis 
Xanthoparmelia pinguiacida 
Xanthoparmelia plana 
Xanthoparmelia planilobata 
Xanthoparmelia plittii 
Xanthoparmelia poeltii 
Xanthoparmelia pokornyi 
Xanthoparmelia polystictica 
Xanthoparmelia ponderosa 
Xanthoparmelia praegnans 
Xanthoparmelia princeps 
Xanthoparmelia pristiloba 
Xanthoparmelia probarbellata  – Africa
Xanthoparmelia prodomokosii 
Xanthoparmelia prolata 
Xanthoparmelia prolixula 
Xanthoparmelia protodysprosa  – Africa
Xanthoparmelia protolusitana 
Xanthoparmelia protomatrae 
Xanthoparmelia protoquintaria 
Xanthoparmelia proximata  – Africa
Xanthoparmelia pseudepheboides 
Xanthoparmelia pseudoamphixantha 
Xanthoparmelia pseudocafferensis 
Xanthoparmelia pseudocongensis 
Xanthoparmelia pseudoglabrans 
Xanthoparmelia pseudohungarica 
Xanthoparmelia pseudohypoleia 
Xanthoparmelia pseudoloriloba 
Xanthoparmelia pseudopulla 
Xanthoparmelia psornorstictica 
Xanthoparmelia psoromica 
Xanthoparmelia psoromifera 
Xanthoparmelia pudens 
Xanthoparmelia pulla 
Xanthoparmelia pulloides 
Xanthoparmelia pulvinaria 
Xanthoparmelia pumila 
Xanthoparmelia punctulata 
Xanthoparmelia purdieae 
Xanthoparmelia pustulescens 
Xanthoparmelia pustulifera  – Africa
Xanthoparmelia pustuliza 
Xanthoparmelia pustulosa 
Xanthoparmelia pustulosorediata 
Xanthoparmelia putida 
Xanthoparmelia putsoa 
Xanthoparmelia pyrenaica

Q
Xanthoparmelia quinonella 
Xanthoparmelia quintaria 
Xanthoparmelia quintarioides

R
Xanthoparmelia ralla 
Xanthoparmelia ralstoniana 
Xanthoparmelia rankinensis 
Xanthoparmelia remanella 
Xanthoparmelia remanens 
Xanthoparmelia remnantia 
Xanthoparmelia reptans 
Xanthoparmelia rimalis 
Xanthoparmelia roderickii 
Xanthoparmelia rogersii 
Xanthoparmelia rubrireagens 
Xanthoparmelia rubromedulla  – Africa
Xanthoparmelia rubropustulata  – Africa
Xanthoparmelia rugulosa 
Xanthoparmelia rugulosella 
Xanthoparmelia rupestris 
Xanthoparmelia ryssolea

S

Xanthoparmelia salamphixantha 
Xanthoparmelia salazinica 
Xanthoparmelia saleruptens 
Xanthoparmelia salkiboensis 
Xanthoparmelia sammyi 
Xanthoparmelia saniensis  – Africa
Xanthoparmelia santessonii 
Xanthoparmelia sargentii 
Xanthoparmelia scabrella 
Xanthoparmelia scabrosa 
Xanthoparmelia scabrosina 
Xanthoparmelia scabrosinita 
Xanthoparmelia schenckiana 
Xanthoparmelia schistacea 
Xanthoparmelia schmidtii 
Xanthoparmelia scotophylla 
Xanthoparmelia scutariae 
Xanthoparmelia seginata 
Xanthoparmelia segregata 
Xanthoparmelia semiviridis 
Xanthoparmelia serpulina 
Xanthoparmelia serusiauxii  – Africa
Xanthoparmelia shebaiensis 
Xanthoparmelia sigillata 
Xanthoparmelia simulans  – Africa
Xanthoparmelia sipmanii 
Xanthoparmelia sitiens 
Xanthoparmelia skottsbergiana 
Xanthoparmelia skyrinifera  – Africa
Xanthoparmelia sleei  – Australia
Xanthoparmelia somervilleae  – Australia
Xanthoparmelia sorediata 
Xanthoparmelia spargenosa 
Xanthoparmelia spargens 
Xanthoparmelia spesica 
Xanthoparmelia spodochroa 
Xanthoparmelia springbokensis 
Xanthoparmelia squamans 
Xanthoparmelia squamariata 
Xanthoparmelia squamariatella 
Xanthoparmelia squamatica 
Xanthoparmelia standaertii 
Xanthoparmelia stanthorpensis 
Xanthoparmelia stenophylla 
Xanthoparmelia stenosporonica  – Africa
Xanthoparmelia streimannii 
Xanthoparmelia stuartensis  – Australia
Xanthoparmelia stuartioides 
Xanthoparmelia subalpina 
Xanthoparmelia subamplexuloides 
Xanthoparmelia subbarbatica 
Xanthoparmelia subbullata 
Xanthoparmelia subcolorata  – Africa
Xanthoparmelia subconvoluta 
Xanthoparmelia subcrustacea 
Xanthoparmelia subcrustosa  – Africa
Xanthoparmelia subcrustulosa 
Xanthoparmelia subcumberlandia 
Xanthoparmelia subdecipiens 
Xanthoparmelia subdiffluens 
Xanthoparmelia subdistorta 
Xanthoparmelia suberadicata 
Xanthoparmelia subflabellata 
Xanthoparmelia subhosseana 
Xanthoparmelia subimitatrix 
Xanthoparmelia subincerta 
Xanthoparmelia sublaevis 
Xanthoparmelia sublineola 
Xanthoparmelia subloxodella 
Xanthoparmelia subluminosa 
Xanthoparmelia submougeotii 
Xanthoparmelia subnigra  – Africa
Xanthoparmelia subnuda 
Xanthoparmelia subochracea  – Africa
Xanthoparmelia subpallida  – Africa
Xanthoparmelia subpigmentosa 
Xanthoparmelia subplittii 
Xanthoparmelia subpolyphylloides 
Xanthoparmelia subprolixa 
Xanthoparmelia subramigera 
Xanthoparmelia subruginosa  – Africa
Xanthoparmelia subrugulosa 
Xanthoparmelia subsorediata 
Xanthoparmelia subspodochroa 
Xanthoparmelia subsquamariata 
Xanthoparmelia subsquamariata 
Xanthoparmelia substrigosa 
Xanthoparmelia substygiodes 
Xanthoparmelia subtaractica 
Xanthoparmelia subtasmanica 
Xanthoparmelia subtinctina 
Xanthoparmelia subtortula 
Xanthoparmelia subtropica 
Xanthoparmelia subulcerosa 
Xanthoparmelia subumbilicata 
Xanthoparmelia subverrucella 
Xanthoparmelia subverrucigera  – Spain
Xanthoparmelia subvicariella  – Australia
Xanthoparmelia succedans 
Xanthoparmelia sulcifera 
Xanthoparmelia supposita 
Xanthoparmelia surrogata  – Africa
Xanthoparmelia swartbergensis  – Africa
Xanthoparmelia synestia

T

Xanthoparmelia tablensis  – Africa
Xanthoparmelia taractica 
Xanthoparmelia tasmanica 
Xanthoparmelia tatimirix 
Xanthoparmelia tegeta 
Xanthoparmelia tenacea 
Xanthoparmelia tentaculina 
Xanthoparmelia tenuiloba 
Xanthoparmelia terrestris 
Xanthoparmelia terricola  – Africa
Xanthoparmelia teydea  – Canary Islands
Xanthoparmelia thamnoides 
Xanthoparmelia thamnolica  – Africa
Xanthoparmelia thorstenii 
Xanthoparmelia tibellii 
Xanthoparmelia tinctina 
Xanthoparmelia togashii 
Xanthoparmelia tolucensis 
Xanthoparmelia toninioides  – Africa
Xanthoparmelia toolbrunupensis  – Australia
Xanthoparmelia tortula 
Xanthoparmelia torulosa 
Xanthoparmelia trachythallina 
Xanthoparmelia transvaalensis  – Africa
Xanthoparmelia treurensis  – Africa
Xanthoparmelia triebeliae  – South Africa
Xanthoparmelia trirosea  – Australia
Xanthoparmelia tropica 
Xanthoparmelia tsekensis 
Xanthoparmelia tuberculata 
Xanthoparmelia tuberculiformis 
Xanthoparmelia tuckeriana 
Xanthoparmelia tucsonensis 
Xanthoparmelia tumidosa  – Africa
Xanthoparmelia tyrrhea 
Xanthoparmelia tzaneenensis

U
Xanthoparmelia ulcerosa 
Xanthoparmelia umezuana 
Xanthoparmelia umtamvuna  – Africa
Xanthoparmelia unctula 
Xanthoparmelia uruguayensis 
Xanthoparmelia usitata 
Xanthoparmelia ustulata

V

Xanthoparmelia vagans 
Xanthoparmelia valdeta 
Xanthoparmelia vanderbylii 
Xanthoparmelia vendensis  – Africa
Xanthoparmelia verdonii 
Xanthoparmelia verecunda 
Xanthoparmelia verisidiosa 
Xanthoparmelia verrucella 
Xanthoparmelia verruciformis 
Xanthoparmelia verrucigera 
Xanthoparmelia verruculifera 
Xanthoparmelia versicolor 
Xanthoparmelia vicaria 
Xanthoparmelia vicariella 
Xanthoparmelia vicentii  – Europe
Xanthoparmelia victoriana  – Australia
Xanthoparmelia villamilianus 
Xanthoparmelia violacea 
Xanthoparmelia viridis  – Africa
Xanthoparmelia viriduloumbrina 
Xanthoparmelia volcanicola

W

Xanthoparmelia waboombergensis 
Xanthoparmelia waboomsbergensis  – Africa
Xanthoparmelia waiporiensis 
Xanthoparmelia walteri  – Africa
Xanthoparmelia weberi 
Xanthoparmelia weberiella  – Australia
Xanthoparmelia wesselsii  – Africa
Xanthoparmelia wildeae 
Xanthoparmelia willisii 
Xanthoparmelia wirthii 
Xanthoparmelia wisangerensis  – Australia
Xanthoparmelia worcesteri 
Xanthoparmelia wrightiana  – South America
Xanthoparmelia wyomingica

X
Xanthoparmelia xanthofarinosa  – Australia
Xanthoparmelia xanthomelaena 
Xanthoparmelia xanthomelanella 
Xanthoparmelia xanthomelanoides 
Xanthoparmelia xavieri 
Xanthoparmelia xerica 
Xanthoparmelia xerophila 
Xanthoparmelia xizangensis

Y
Xanthoparmelia yamblaensis 
Xanthoparmelia yowaensis  – Australia

Z
Xanthoparmelia zimbabwana 
Xanthoparmelia zonata  – Australia

References

Cited literature

Xanthoparmelia